Dragana Todorović (born 15 March 1974), known by her stage name Jana, is a Serbian turbo-folk and pop folk singer.

Biography
Jana was born in Pristina on March 15, 1974 and grew up in the village of Babin Most, near the town of Obilić, SFR Yugoslavia.

Her career started at the age of fourteen, in 1988, when she visited a well-known kafana in the town of Obilić one night with her parents and brother (who played the accordion). She had worn a white overcoat and pink hat. During dinner, she took the microphone, got a chair, and, being shy, turned her back against the audience and started singing "Što me pitaš" (Why Are You Asking Me) by Šemsa Suljaković to roaring applause.

After finishing the Stevan Mokranjac music academy in her hometown, she recorded an album in 1992 that sold very few copies and flopped. She went back to performing in kafanas throughout Kosovo, then took a short break from singing due to the disappointment of her last album, working as a music educator.

In 1997, she met singer Marina Živković in Kosovska Mitrovica, a meeting which kick-started her career. As Živković was preparing for her concert, she overheard Todorović singing and was left 'breathless'. She asked for Jana to come to her table and talk and after the conversation, she recommended Jana to friend, Ivan Todorović (Jana's future husband) who owned a discothèque and was in need of a live band. Not long after, Ivan traveled to Priština to meet with Jana. That day, Jana and her cousin met up with him near the Grand Hotel and struck up a record deal. In October 1997, with great sadness, she left her home country and moved to Germany, four months prior to the outbreak of war in Kosovo. She became extremely homesick in Germany, but was unable to travel home because of the insecurity. She was signed to the now-defunct record label Zabava miliona (ZAM). As there already was a famous singer called Dragana Mirković, Saša Popović, the label's director, recommended her to adopt Jana as her stage name. During the recording of her second album, Sokolica (Falcon, 1998), she fell in love with Ivan Todorović and they later married. Her first album was a huge success and she went on tour with famous singer Lepa Brena.

She then recorded her third album, Prolaznica (Free Pass, 1999), under the label Grand Production (formerly ZaM).

Jana's fourth studio album, Ostavi mi drugove (Leave My Friends, 2000), featured the hit songs "Ko visoko leti" (He Who Flies High), "Robinja" (Slave) and the title track. It was followed by her fifth release: Prevare do prevare (Affair After Affair, 2001) had the hit songs "Barabar" (Unison) and "Tuge mi dovoljno" (I've had enough pain).

For her seventh album, Zidovi (Walls, 2003), she started to work with VIP Production (later renamed BN Music), a label founded and owned by her husband Ivan Todorović. It was the first album distributed by VIP Production.

Jana released three more albums under the label: Malo magije (A Little Magic, 2005), Kući, kući (Home, Home, 2007) and Jana Dva (Jana Two, 2011).

On 2 November 2006, Jana and her husband had a daughter, Kristina Džulijen Todorović.

Discography

Albums
Imam moć (1992)
Sokolica (1998)
Prolaznica (1999)
Ostavi mi drugove (2000)
Prevara do prevare (2001)
5 (2002)
Zidovi (2003)
Malo magije (2005)
Kući, kući (2007)
Jana Dva (2011)

Sokolica (1998)
Crna ovca
Druge ljubiš srcem
Dva života
Gresi nebeski
Hiljadu puta
Kapitulacija
Moje drugo lice
Primadona
Sestre
Sokolica

Prolaznica (1999)
Prolaznica
Mostovi
Za tebe za mene
Željna
Piši propalo
Umirem ti majko
Ožiljak
Inostranstvo
Veselo društvo
Spremna na sve

Ostavi mi drugove (2000)
Ostavi mi drugove
Robinja
Ko visoko leti
Odvedi me srećo
Pesmu imam samo
Samica
Tamo gde me najviše boli
Patila sam ja
Neće moći tako
Oprosti ženo

Prevara do prevare (2001)
Prevera do prevare
Tuge mi dovoljno
Sviraj nešto narodno
Dođe mi da vrisnem (featuring Saša Matić)
Nazdravi sa mnom
Kuda
'Ajde dođi, šta ćeš tu?
Lažu me lažu
Jasno je
Barabar

5 (2002)
Hajde Jano
Htela sam ti reći
Miraz
Pa nek sama večera
Piješ, ne nudiš
Rođena za kraljicu
Samo da znaš
Šta će ti pevačica
Suviše lepa
Vratiti se neću
Za badava

Zidovi (2003)
Koje li su boje njene oči?
Rame uz rame
I lomi i moli
Duh iz lampe
Svi dignu ruke
Zidovi
Kad slavuji zapevaju (featuring Šekib Mujanović)
Evo, ja ću
Srećna nova
Za mene se zna

Malo magije (2005)
Ne pitaj
Malo magije
Imam pravo
Crna kutija
Cena tuge
Sunce sjalo (featuring Sejo Kalač)
Troši me ove noći
Ja sam tvoja
Stari prevarant
Zabranili ženi piće

Kući, kući (2007)
Iza tvojih prozora
Idi pa se leči
Ja nisam ona
Beleg
Kući, kući
Prevari me
Ljubav nije greh
Kunem ti se
Tužni se smeju najlepše
Ja te samo ljubim

Jana Dva (2011)
New songs
Jana 2
Rane od pre
Kada se svetla pogase
Princeza
Višak prtljaga
Nije in da budeš fin
Jutro posle
Niko nije kriv
Gori kuća naša
Old songs as bonus tracks
Kući kući
Iza tvojih prozora
Beleg
Ne pitaj
Crna kutija
Stari prevarant
Cena tuge
Ljubav nije greh
Ja nisam ona

Non-album singles
Lune, lune (2012)
Zapevaj, zaigraj (2012)
Bruka i sramota (2013)
Anđele Moj (2013)
Boginja (2014)
Može, može (2014)
Bravo, bravo (2015)
Ostavljam (2015)
Samo široko (2015)

As featured artist
Jutro tuge (2009) with Asim Bajrić
Ti i ja (2012) with MC Stojan 
Za sve dobre ribe with Marta Savić (2012) 
Aj, milo moje (2012) with Jasmin Jusić
Muči me (2013) with DJ Sky
Lude godine (2013) with DJ Đuro
Sve bih dala (2015) with Đogani
Lepoto moja (2015) with Big Time & DJ Mr.Dani-E
Sipaj mi duplo (2016) with Deny
Pevačica (2017) with MC Stojan
Vesti (2018) with Mirko Plavšić 
• “Nemoguce” with Hako Sljivar (2019)

References

1974 births
Living people
21st-century Serbian women singers
People from the District of Pristina
Kosovo Serbs
Grand Production artists
Serbian turbo-folk singers
Kosovan singers
20th-century Serbian women singers